Paul Lawrence "Leafy" Burnham (born ) is a cricket supporter from Twickenham, London, England. He is one of the founding members of the Barmy Army of supporters of the England cricket team.

Personal life 
Burnham was educated at Hampton School. Burnham has a sports and business degree and in 1984, he started working for British Airways in their cargo division. He is nicknamed "Leafy" which came from his time working at British Airways and was originally "tea leaf", the cockney rhyming slang for "thief". He has played cricket for Old Hamptonians.

Barmy Army 
In 1994, Burnham travelled to Australia to watch The Ashes. There he met a number of other English supporters who were noted for singing songs, despite England losing. They received press attention which was positive in Australia but negative in the British press. Burnham then trademarked the name "Barmy Army" in the United Kingdom and Australia and created a number of replica shirts with it on them which sold out. 

After the Ashes, Burnham started running the Barmy Army on a part-time basis while supplementing his income by working as a bookmaker and writing for various cricket magazines. In 1997, he negotiated the Barmy Army's first sponsorship deal with Vodafone to support the Barmy Army's tour of the West Indies. He started working for the Barmy Army full-time in 2002 as the organizer after creating a website and travel agency for them. Burnham also set up the Barmy Army's operations office in Sunbury-on-Thames. Burnham has also been involved in charity fundraisers.

References 

Living people
People educated at Hampton School
Sportspeople from Twickenham
1960s births
Cricket supporters